Gustavo Fernández defeated Gordon Reid in the final, 7–6(7–4), 6–1 to win the men's singles wheelchair tennis title at the 2016 French Open. It was his first major singles title.

Shingo Kunieda was the two-time defending champion, but was defeated by Fernández in the semifinals.

Seeds

Draw

Finals

References
 Entry List
 Draw

Wheelchair Men's Singles
French Open, 2016 Men's Singles